The See What You Started Tour was a concert tour headlined by American rock band Collective Soul, in support of their ninth studio album, See What You Started by Continuing.

Background
The tour was announced by the band through a video posted to Facebook on July 27, 2015. Tickets for most early dates went on sale to the public two days later.

Tour dates

Additional notes
 A  This concert was aired live on Yahoo! Screen.

Rescheduled show

Personnel
Collective Soul
 Ed Roland – lead vocals, guitar, keyboards 
 Dean Roland – rhythm guitar, keyboards 
 Will Turpin – bass, backing vocals 
 Jesse Triplett – lead guitar
 Johnny Rabb – drums, percussion

References

2015 concert tours
2016 concert tours
Collective Soul concert tours
Concert tours of Canada
Concert tours of South America
Concert tours of the United States